James Abbott (born 1892, date of death unknown) was a footballer who played in the Football League for Manchester City. He was born in Patricroft, England.

He played in three top flight games for Manchester City, prior to the outbreak of World War One, scoring two goals in three games, including a goal on his debut at Sheffield United in September 1913. He had moved to the Hyde Road club after non-League spells with Barton Albion and Eccles Borough.

References

English footballers
Manchester City F.C. players
English Football League players
1892 births
Year of death missing
Eccles United F.C. players
Association football inside forwards